Raymond Leon Stone (September 2, 1923 – June 17, 2013) was an American politician, educator and jazz musician. He served as the Mayor of Coeur d'Alene, Idaho, for two consecutive terms from January 1986 to January 1994. Stone was awarded the Eisenhower Liberation Medal by the United States Holocaust Memorial Museum in 1988 for his part in the liberation of Wöbbelin concentration camp during World War II, as well as the campaign by the city of Coeur d'Alene against local Neo-Nazi groups in the northern Idaho Panhandle.

Biography
Stone was born in Craigmont, Idaho, on September 2, 1923, to Myra and Elmer Stone. He became a drummer during high school.

Stone graduated from high school in 1941 and enrolled in college in Lewiston State Normal School (present-day Lewis–Clark State College). However, he decided to leave college and enlist in the United States Army following the Attack on Pearl Harbor.

References

1923 births
2013 deaths
Coeur d'Alene
People from Coeur d'Alene, Idaho
American jazz musicians
United States Army personnel of World War II
Whitworth University alumni